General elections to the States were held in Alderney on 6 December 2008 in accordance with the rules governing elections in Alderney. All five elected members were independents. The results were complicated by the first ever tie in Alderney's electoral history, between John Beaman and Don Oakden, both with 294 votes. After the drawing of a name from the ballot box by the returning officer, Beaman was elected in fifth place.

Results

|-
!style="background-color:#E9E9E9" align=left valign=top width=400|Candidates
!style="background-color:#E9E9E9" align=right|Votes
|-
|align=left|Peter Allen (Elected)
|align="right" |520
|-
|align=left| Boyd Kelly (Elected)
|align="right" |409
|-
|align=left|Geoffrey Sargent (Elected)
|align="right" |376
|-
|align=left|Bill Walden (Elected)
|align="right" |312
|-
|align=left|John Beaman (Elected)
|align="right" |294
|-
|align=left|Don Oakden
|align="right" |294
|-
|align=left|Barry Pengilley
|align="right" |220
|-
|align=left|Lin Maurice
|align="right" |201
|-
|align=left|Lois FitzGerald
|align="right" |199
|-
|align=left|Martin Hunt
|align="right" |98
|-
|}

References

External links
Alderney Government

2008
2008 elections in Europe
2008 in Guernsey
December 2008 events in Europe